This is a list of political parties in the United States, both past and present. The list does not include independents.

Active parties

Major parties

Third parties

Represented in state legislatures 
The following third parties have members in state legislatures affiliated with them.

Represented in the legislature of the unincorporated territory of Puerto Rico  
The following third parties are represented in the Puerto Rican Legislature.

Parties with ballot access for Congress, state legislatures, or territorial legislatures 
The following third parties have ballot access in at least one state and are not represented in a national office, state legislature, or territorial legislature.

Multi-state or territory

Single state or territory

Active parties without ballot access
The following parties have been active in the past 4 years, but as of December 2021 did not have official ballot access in any state.

Multi-state or territory

Single state or territory

Historical parties

Held national office or elected to Congress

Multi-State political parties

Single state political parties

Political parties in the unincorporated territories

Non-electoral organizations

Active

These organizations generally do not nominate candidates for election, but some of them have in the past; they otherwise function similarly to political parties.

Historical
These historical organizations did not officially nominate candidates for election, but may have endorsed or supported campaigns; they otherwise functioned similarly to political parties.

See also

Political parties in the United States
List of frivolous political parties
List of ruling political parties by country
List of political parties in Puerto Rico
List of state parties of the Democratic Party
List of state Green Parties in the United States
List of state parties of the Libertarian Party
List of state parties of the Republican Party
Party system
Political party strength in U.S. states
Politics of the United States
Third party (United States)
Two-party system

Notes 
Notes

Footnotes

Further reading

External links 
Party Links
Political Parties Timeline
Ballot Access News
Politics1 Directory of Candidates
Independent Political Candidate Directory at IndeCan
Educational quiz that matches policy answers to U.S. political parties known as I Side With

United States

Political parties